Yvonne Stoffel-Wagener (16 May 1931 – 5 April 2014) was a Luxembourgian gymnast. She competed in five events at the 1960 Summer Olympics.

References

1931 births
2014 deaths
Luxembourgian female artistic gymnasts
Olympic gymnasts of Luxembourg
Gymnasts at the 1960 Summer Olympics
Sportspeople from Esch-sur-Alzette